Michael Louis Chapman is a law enforcement executive who is the current sheriff of Loudoun County, Virginia and administrator of the Loudoun County Sheriff's Office.

Early life
Chapman was born in Washington, D.C. and began his law enforcement career with the Howard County Police Department (Maryland) in 1978. Chapman joined the Drug Enforcement Administration in 1985, and retired in 2008. Chapman was elected as Sheriff in Loudoun County, Virginia in November 2011, officially taking office on January 1, 2012. He has since been re-elected in 2015  and 2019, beginning his third term in January 2020.

Chapman has a Bachelor of Science in Business Management from the University of Maryland, and a Masters in Public Administration from Troy University, Alabama.

Sheriff of Loudoun County 

Chapman has prioritized initiatives in the areas of service, technology, efficiency and professionalism in all of his campaigns for election. Some of his most notable initiatives have been providing Crisis Intervention Team (CIT) training for all sworn deputies and dispatchers, collaborating with mental health providers to open the Crisis Intervention Team Assessment Center (CITAC), expanding the Drug Abuse Resistance Education (D.A.R.E) program to include elementary and middle schools, establishing the a multi-disciplinary team to reduce opioid issues, instituting a Cold Case Initiative to revitalize investigation of unsolved crimes, and expanding education and outreach programs to include internet safety, prescription and synthetic drug awareness, and the dangers of vaping.

In 2019, Chapman criticized Loudoun County Board of Supervisors Chairwoman Phyllis Randall's idea, presented in a media session shortly after her reelection, to form a county police department, which would require a countywide referendum, and relegate the Sheriff's Office to court and corrections duties. In 2021, Chapman, in documents released by Fox News, refused the Loudoun County Public Schools superintendent Scott Ziegler's request for additional security at school board meetings, including undercover deputies and special operations personnel, saying the request was "extraordinary" and that Ziegler failed "to provide any justification for such a manpower intensive request."

National Positions 
Chapman has held national-level leadership positions with the Major County Sheriff's of America, the National Sheriffs' Association, and the D.A.R.E. Executive Law Enforcement Advisory Board. In 2020, Chapman was appointed Chair of the Homeland Security Working Group on the Presidential Commission on Law Enforcement and the Administration of Justice

Electoral history

Bibliography 

 "Mental Health Training for Law Enforcement is Key to Handling Crises," The Hill
"A Grave Injustice," Richmond Times-Dispatch
"Responding to Mental Health Emergencies: Crisis Intervention Training in Loudoun County," The Police Chief 
 "HOT Program Makes Opioid Crisis Go Cold," Sheriff & Deputy
 "This is the Meaningful, Effective Prison Reform the US Badly Needs," The Hill
 "Leadership in a Sheriff's Campaign," FBI-LEEDA Insighter 
 "Let's Set the Record Straight," LoudounNow

References 

Living people
Virginia sheriffs
Troy University alumni
Virginia Republicans
University of Maryland, College Park alumni
Politicians from Washington, D.C.
Drug Enforcement Administration personnel
People from Loudoun County, Virginia
1957 births